Life Changes is the third studio album by American country pop singer Thomas Rhett. Released on September 8, 2017, through Valory Music Group, Rhett produced the album alongside Dann Huff, Jesse Frasure, Julian Bunetta and Joe London. It includes the chart-topping singles "Craving You" with Maren Morris, and "Unforgettable". The album debuted at No. 1 with 123,000 album-equivalent units, giving Rhett his first number one album on the Billboard 200.

Singles
"Craving You", a duet with Maren Morris, was released digitally on March 31, 2017 as the record's lead single. It was promoted to country radio on April 3, 2017. The song hit number one on both the US Country Airplay chart and the Canada Country chart. The second single, "Unforgettable", was released to radio on July 28, 2017. "Marry Me" was released to radio on November 20, 2017, as the album's third single.

The title track was released to radio April 9, 2018, as the fourth single.

Promotional singles
A promotional single, "Sixteen", was released on August 11, 2017. A second promotional single, "Grave", was released on August 18, 2017.  The title track was released as the third promotional single on September 1, 2017.

Rhett released a song, titled "Sweetheart", exclusively to Billboard on September 7, a day ahead of the release of the album. A remix extended play for the track "Leave Right Now" was released April 13, 2018, as the album's fifth promotional single.

Commercial performance
Life Changes debuted at number one on the Billboard 200, giving Rhett his first chart-topping album. It sold 94,000 copies in the first week (with 123,000 album-equivalent units total), Rhett's best sales and units week. The album is also the first country album to top the Billboard 200 chart in 2017. It sold a further 20,400 copies in its second week. The album was certified Platinum by the RIAA for a million units in sales and streams on September 6, 2018. It has sold 319,600 copies in the United States as of March 2019.

Track listing

Personnel
Musicians
 Thomas Rhett – lead vocals, backing vocals (6)
 Charlie Judge – keyboards (1–4, 7–14), synthesizers (5), strings (5)
 Julien Bunetta – keyboards (1, 6, 10, 13), programming (1, 6, 10, 11, 12), electric guitar (1, 10, 13), guitars (6), drums (6), backing vocals (6)
 Joe London – programming (1, 10–13), keyboards (10, 13), electric guitar (10, 12)
 Jesse Frasure – programming (2–5, 7, 8, 9, 14)
 John Ryan – programming (6)
 Matt Dragstrem – programming (9), backing vocals (9)
 Sam Ellis – keyboards (13), programming (13)
 Dann Huff – electric guitar (1–5, 7–14), ganjo (1), mandolin (1)
 Derek Wells – electric guitar (1–5, 7–14)
 Danny Rader – acoustic guitar (1, 10–13)
 Ilya Toshinsky – acoustic guitar (2–9, 14)
 Paul Franklin – steel guitar (2, 9, 13)
 Skip Edwards – steel guitar (10)
 Jimmie Lee Sloas – bass (1–5, 7–14)
 Chris Kimmerer – drums (1–5, 7–14)
 Stuart Duncan – fiddle (4)
 Tom Peyton – trombone (11)
 Nate Mercereau – French horn (11)
 Maren Morris – lead and harmony vocals (1)
 Russell Terrell – backing vocals (1–4, 7, 8, 10, 13)
 Rhett Akins – lead and backing vocals (4)
 Jessi Alexander – backing vocals (9)
 David Lee Murphy – backing vocals (9)
 Dave Barnes – backing vocals (11)
 Ben Caver – backing vocals (11, 12)
 Jordan Reynolds – backing vocals (11)
 Emily Weisband – backing vocals (13)
 Bob Bailey – backing vocals (14)
 Jason Eskridge – backing vocals (14)
 Vicki Hampton – backing vocals (14)
 Wendy Moten – backing vocals (14)

Technical and design
 Joe Baldridge – recording (1–5, 7–14)
 Julien Bunetta – additional recording (1, 10), recording (6)
 Joe London – additional recording (1, 10)
 Jesse Frasure – additional recording (2–5, 8, 9)
 Russell Terrell – additional recording (2, 3, 7, 8, 10, 11, 13)
 Seth Morton – recording assistant (1–5, 7–14), additional recording (14)
 Kam Luchterhand – recording assistant (7, 14)
 John Hanes – mix engineer (1)
 Serban Ghenea – mixing (1)
 Justin Niebank – mixing (2–5, 7, 8, 9, 11–14)
 Ash Howes – mixing (6, 10)
 Chris Small – digital editing (1–5, 7, 8, 9, 11, 13, 14)
 Adam Ayan – mastering at Gateway Mastering (Portland, Maine)
 Mike "Frog" Griffith – production coordinator 
 Laurel Kittleson – production coordinator 
 Janice Soled – production coordinator 
 Brianna Steinitz – production coordinator 
 Becky Reiser – art direction, graphics
 Sandi Spika Borchetta – art direction
 John Shearer – photography

Awards

Charts

Weekly charts

Year-end charts

Decade-end charts

Certifications

References

2017 albums
Albums produced by Dann Huff
Big Machine Records albums
Thomas Rhett albums
Albums produced by Jesse Frasure